Love Songs, part of a series of compilation albums that features love/romantic songs from various artists', is the 3rd collection of hits by Vanessa Williams released in 2004. The album features 12 songs, including hits like "Dreamin'", "Save the Best for Last", and "Just for Tonight", 2 previously unreleased songs in the U.S., "Alfie" and "April Fools", a remixed version of "The Way That You Love", and "Love Like This", which was taken from the B-side of the single "Just for Tonight" from The Comfort Zone album.

Track listing 

 The Way That You Love (Late-Night Mix) 
 Dreamin'   
 Alfie  
 Love Like This   
 And My Heart Goes   
 Still In Love   
 Just for Tonight   
 Someone Like You (Van Morrison)   
 And If I Ever   
 Can This Be Real   
 April Fools
 Save the Best for Last

2004 compilation albums
Vanessa Williams compilation albums